The Sonian Forest or Sonian Wood is a  forest at the southeast edge of Brussels, Belgium.

The Sonian Forest was a favorite hunting ground of the Habsburg Imperial family, and as such features prominently in some famous Renaissance works of art such as the Hunts of Maximilian tapestries in the Louvre.

The forest lies in the Flemish municipalities of Sint-Genesius-Rode, Hoeilaart, Overijse, and Tervuren, in the Brussels-Capital Region municipalities of Uccle, Watermael-Boitsfort, Auderghem, and Woluwe-Saint-Pierre, and in the Walloon towns of La Hulpe and Waterloo. Thus, it stretches out over the three Belgian Regions.

It is maintained by Flanders (56%), the Brussels-Capital Region (38%), and Wallonia (6%). There are some contiguous tracts of privately held forest and the Kapucijnenbos, the "Capuchin Wood", which belongs to the Royal Trust.

As of 2017, parts of the Sonian Forest have been inscribed as a UNESCO World Heritage Site, the only Belgian component to the multinational inscription 'Primeval Beech Forests of the Carpathians and Other Regions of Europe', because of their undisturbed nature and testimony to the ecological processes governing forests in Europe since the Last Glacial Period.

History

The forest is part of the scattered remains of the ancient Silva Carbonaria or Charcoal Forest. The first mention of the Sonian Forest (Soniaca Silva) dates from the early Middle Ages. Then the forest south of Brussels was crossed by the river Zenne/Senne and extended as far as Hainaut, covering most of the high ground between the Zenne and the Dijle. The ninth-century vita of Saint Foillan mentions "the forest, next to the abbey of Saint Gertrude, called the Sonesian". In the sixteenth century it was still seven leagues in circumference.  At the start of the 19th century the area of the wood was still about 100 square kilometres, but due to wood cutting its area diminished to its current area of 44.21 km².

The Forest extended in the Middle Ages over the southern part of Brabant up to the walls of Brussels and is mentioned, under the name of Ardennes, in Byron's Childe Harold. Originally it was part of the Forest of Ardennes, the Romans' Arduenna Silva, and even at the time of the French Revolution it was very extensive. A major blow towards its nineteenth-century contraction was struck when Napoleon Bonaparte ordered 22,000 oaks to be cut down in it to build the Boulogne flotilla intended for the invasion of England. Rights to a considerable portion of the forest in the neighbourhood of Waterloo was assigned in 1815 to the Duke of Wellington, who is Prince of Waterloo in the Dutch nobility, and to the holder of the title as long as it endured; the present duke receives the equivalent of about $140,000 from his Belgian properties. This portion of the forest was only converted into farms in the time of the second duke. The Bois de la Cambre (456 acres) on the outskirts of Brussels was formed out of the forest in 1861. In 1911 the forest still stretched to Tervuren, Groenendaal, and Argenteuil close to Mont-Saint-Jean and Waterloo.

Formerly the forest held the Abbey of Saint Foillan not far from Nivelles. The forest served for a long period as an exclusive hunting ground for the nobility, but today is open to the general public.

Ecology 

Today the forest consists mainly of European beeches and oaks. Several trees are more than 200 years old, dating from the Austrian period.

The forest contains a somewhat reduced fauna and flora. Due to human influence (encroachment from all sides of the outer edges as well as the long-established thoroughfare roads and highways cutting deep through the forest) and impoverishment of the ecosystem, various plants and animals have become extinct. The forest was home to 46 different mammal species. Of these, seven have disappeared altogether: the brown bear (around 1000), the wolf (around 1810), the hazel dormouse (around 1842), the red deer, the badger and the hare. Stag beetles have also disappeared from the forest. The boar was thought to have been extinct since 1957, but in 2007, new specimens were discovered roaming the wood. According to the Flemish Agency for Nature and Forest (ANB), this is unlikely to be a natural spread, but probably two to four animals that most likely were either released or escaped from captivity.

The many species of bat in the forest led to it being classified as a Natura 2000 protected site. This includes five endangered species: the mouse-eared bat, Geoffroy's bat, the barbastelle bat, the pond bat and Bechstein's bat. Other animal species found in the forest, including the black woodpecker and the great crested newt, are considered endangered and are protected by the European Habitats Directive.

In 2016, the Sonian Forest joined the "European Rewilding Network", an initiative of the Rewilding Europe organisation. The project aims to enable the growth in numbers of natural fauna such as roe deer and wild boar. Various types of wildlife crossings have been or are due to be constructed to reconnect the areas of the forest that are currently divided by large roads. A  wildlife crossing ('Ecoduct') has been built across the Brussels Ring (R0); construction started in 2016 and it was opened in June 2018.

Attractions 

A museum has been set up in the building of the old farm of the Groenendaal priory. The Bosmuseum Jan van Ruusbroec or Musée de la Forêt ('Forest Museum') presents displays about the flora, fauna, history of the forest, and forest management.

Monasteries and contemplative traditions 
Amongst the contemplative monks and nuns who lived and prayed in the forest, the most notable was John of Ruysbroeck who established a Monastery near Groenendaal at Vauvert. At this time the forest also held a house of Cistercian nuns at Pennebeek (founded 1201 on land given by Henry I, Duke of Brabant to Sister Gisle); a convent of Benedictine nuns at Forest (founded in 1107 by Gilbert de Gand) and a cloister of Dominican sisters at Val Duchesne (founded 1262 the Duchess Aleyde).

Influence on literature
 Byron Childe Harold's Pilgrimage
 Victor Hugo Les Misérables
 Sir Walter Scott The Field of Waterloo

Influence on art
 Auguste Rodin made frequent trips to the forest while living in Brussels in the 1870s. He made several paintings of the forest during this time.

Battle of Waterloo
The Forest of Soignes lay behind the Anglo-allied Army of the Duke of Wellington at the Battle of Waterloo. From the time of the Romans it had generally been seen as a tactical blunder to position troops for battle in front of woodland because it hampers their ability to retreat. Napoleon Bonaparte in Mémoires pour servir à l'histoire de France en 1815, avec le plan de la bataille de Mont-Saint-Jean repeatedly criticised the Duke of Wellington's choice of battle field because of the forest to his rear.

On page 124, Bonaparte wrote, "He had in his rear the denies of the forest of Soignes, so that, if beaten, retreat was impossible", and on page 158 — "The enemy must have seen with affright how many difficulties the field of battle he had chosen was about to throw in the way of his retreat", and again on page 207 — "The position of Mont-Saint-Jean was ill-chosen. The first requisite of a field of battle, is, to have no defiles in its rear. The injudicious choice of his field of battle, rendered all retreat impossible." However, Napoleon's view was contradicted by Jomini, who pointed out that Wellington had good roads behind his centre and each wing which would have made a retreat through the forest safer than across an open field: Napoleon's cavalry would have been hampered by the forest in their attempts to turn any retreat into a rout. Some have argued that there was no bottom to the forest and it would not have hampered an extraction given Wellington's superlative expertise in handling an army disengaging from the enemy, while others have suggested that Wellington if pressed intended to retreat eastwards towards Blücher's Prussian army so the interior of the wood was of little military significance.

See also 

 Bois de la Cambre/Ter Kamerenbos
 Rood-Klooster (Rouge-Cloître)
 Groenendael Priory
 List of Waterloo Battlefield locations
Enfants Noyés Nature Reserve, a nature reserve in the Sonian Forest

References

External links 

 
 Sonian Forest Platform (in Dutch and French)

Forests of Belgium
Urban forests in Belgium
Geography of Brussels
Geography of Flemish Brabant
Geography of Walloon Brabant
Tourist attractions in Brussels
Tourist attractions in Flemish Brabant
Tourist attractions in Walloon Brabant
Waterloo Battlefield locations
Auderghem
Hoeilaart
La Hulpe
Overijse
Sint-Genesius-Rode
Tervuren
Uccle
Waterloo, Belgium
Watermael-Boitsfort
Woluwe-Saint-Pierre
Primeval Beech Forests in Europe